"Sue Me" is a song recorded by American singer Sabrina Carpenter from her third studio album Singular: Act I (2018), serving as the fourth track of the album. The track was written by Sabrina Carpenter and Steph Jones and was produced by Warren "Oak" Felder with its co-producers, Trevor Brown, William Zaire Simmons. The song was released by Hollywood Records as the second single from Singular: Act I on November 9, 2018 and was released to contemporary hit radio on January 8, 2019. Lyrically, "Sue Me" is about the relief of being out of a bad relationship and challenging someone to stop them for living their best life.

It was accompanied by a music video directed by Lauren Dunn premiered on her Vevo channel on November 16, 2018. The music video features Carpenter's friend and actress Joey King and Sergio D'arcy Lane and it was shot at Pepperdine University. Carpenter promoted "Sue Me" with several live performances in the release day, on The Today Show and on Live with Kelly and Ryan.

Background and recording
Carpenter wrote the song after she was sued by her ex music managers Stan Rogow and Elliot Lurie for allegedly not paying them commissions after she fired them in August 2014. They claimed that they should have some of the revenue from Carpenter's previous two albums Evolution and Eyes Wide Open. Carpenter has confirmed this is the background, but has not commented on the situation or stated an outcome if there is one yet. Carpenter also stated this song as representing pure confidence. Carpenter said that "Sue Me" was the first track that was giving a direction to the album because it was in a different lane than the other songs that she had written before.

The song was written in September 2017, after Carpenter concluded the De Tour, by Sabrina Carpenter, Warren "Oak" Felder, Steph Jones, Trevor Brown and William Zaire Simmons. It was produced by Felder with Brown and Zaire Koalo as co-producers. Felder, Brown and Koalo did the background vocals while Felder programmed the track and Koalo handled the drum programming. Felder engineered the track at SuCasa Recording in Los Angeles with Keith "Daquan" Sorrells serving as an assistant engineer. The song was mixed by Eric J Dubowsky at Hercules St. Studios in Sydney and Tim Watt served as a mix assistant. The song was mastered at Sterling Sound in New York City by Chris Gehringer.

Music video
Carpenter first premiered a snippet of the music video on November 9, 2018, on TRL. The music video was released through Vevo and YouTube on November 16, 2018. It was directed by Lauren Dunn and Carpenter's friends Joey King and Sergio D'arcy Lane features on the music video. The music video was shot in one day at the Pepperdine University in Malibu, California, the same campus that Zoey 101 was shot. According to the video's hair stylist, Scott King's Instagram story, the video was shot on August 17, 2018. It is said that this video is based on Legally Blonde as it has very similar storylines, characters and features, but Carpenter has not yet confirmed if this is the background.

Live performances
Carpenter first performed the song on November 9, 2018, on The Today Show and Live with Kelly and Ryan. It was fourteenth to be performed on the Singular Tour. Additionally, she performed the song on Good Morning America's Summer Concert Series.

Track listing

Credits and personnel
Recording and management
Recorded at SuCasa Recording (Los Angeles, California)
Mixed at Hercules St. Studios (Sydney, Australia)
Mastered at Sterling Sound (New York City)
Seven Summits Music (BMI) obo Itself and Pink Mic Music (BMI), Sony/ATV Songs LLC/Crew's Tree Publishing (BMI), Vistaville Music (ASCAP) obo Itself, Not That Steph Jones (ASCAP) and Big Deal Hits (ASCAP), Reservoir Media Music obo Itself & The Orphanage LLC/Quest Da Stars (ASCAP), Reservoir Media Music obo Itself & The Orphanage LLC/Downtown Trevor Brown (ASCAP)

Personnel

Sabrina Carpenter – lead vocals, songwriting
Warren "Oak" Felder – songwriting, production , engineering, programming, background vocals
Steph Jones – songwriting
"Downtown" Trevor Brown – songwriting, co-production , background vocals
Zaire Koalo – songwriting, co-production , drum programming, background vocals
Keith "Daquan" Sorrells – assistant engineering
Eric J. Dubowsky – mixing
Tim Watt  – mix assistant
Chris Gehringer – mastering

Credits adapted from Singular: Act I liner notes.

Charts

Weekly charts

Year-end charts

Certifications

Release history

References

2018 singles
2018 songs
Hollywood Records singles
Sabrina Carpenter songs
Songs written by Oak Felder
Songs written by Steph Jones
Songs written by Sabrina Carpenter
Song recordings produced by Oak Felder
Songs written by William Zaire Simmons